Pachyballus caelestis is a species of jumping spider in the genus Pachyballus that lives in the Democratic Republic of the Congo. The female was first described in 2020.

References

Salticidae
Spiders described in 2020
Spiders of Africa
Taxa named by Wanda Wesołowska
Endemic fauna of the Democratic Republic of the Congo